Saccardinula is a genus of fungi in the family Elsinoaceae. The type specimen is at the Swedish Museum of Natural History.

References

 "Saccardinula" www.mycobank.org. Retrieved 2022-12-29.
 "Shroomers - Saccardinula". www.shroomers.app. Retrieved 2022-12-29.
 "Saccardinula Spegazzini, 1885". www.gbif.org. Retrieved 2022-12-29.

Myriangiales